This article lists fellows of the Royal Society elected in 1950.

Fellows

Boris Babkin
Leslie Fleetwood Bates
Thomas Archibald Bennet-Clark
Brebis Bleaney
Leslie Comrie
Charles Coulson
Leslie Reginald Cox
Harold Scott MacDonald Coxeter
Gordon Herriot Cunningham
William Joseph Elford
Sidney Barrington Gates
Cecil Hoare
Leslie Howarth
Sir Ewart Jones
Archer John Porter Martin
David Forbes Martyn
Richard Alan Morton
Richard Julius Pumphrey
Allen Shenstone
Henry Edward Shortt
Carl Johan Fredrik Skottsberg
Maurice Stacey
Leslie Ernest Sutton
Richard Laurence Millington Synge
Sir Boris Uvarov
Sir Frederic Calland Williams

Foreign members

Walter Sydney Adams
Carl Ferdinand Cori
Enrico Fermi

Statute 12 fellows 
George Macauley Trevelyan

References

1950
1950 in science
1950 in the United Kingdom